Viorica Dima Ghican (born 9 June 1965) is a Romanian female former distance runner who competed over distances from 1500 metres to 10,000 metres. She competed in track, road and cross country running disciplines. She was the gold medallist in the 10,000 m at the 1989 Summer Universiade, setting a games record in the process. Among her other individual honours were gold medals at the Balkan Athletics Championships and World University Cross Country Championships in 1988, and silver medals at the 1990 Goodwill Games and 1989 European Cup.

Ghican represented Romania five times at the IAAF World Cross Country Championships from 1986 to 1997, with her best performances being eighth place in the 1990 senior women's race and a team bronze medal at the 1996 competition. She also won international honours in ekiden (marathon relays), including individual and team wins at the Barcelona Ekiden and International Chiba Ekiden in 1990.

Her personal best time of 31:18.18 minutes for the 10,000 m was the fastest time in the world in the 1990 season. This was a Romanian national record until 2002, when it was beaten by Mihaela Botezan. Although she continues to rank high on the Romanian lists, she never won a national title as she was overshadowed by contemporaries such as Olympic champions Maricica Puică and Paula Ivan (who beat her to the 3000 m gold at the 1989 Universiade), as well as Elena Murgoci, Iulia Olteanu and Elena Fidatov among others in a high point for Romanian women's distance running.

On the track and field circuit she won races at the Janusz Kusociński Memorial (1987), and the Meadowlands Invitational, Meeting de Paris, Meeting de Atletismo Sevilla and Helsinki Grand Prix in 1990. She was third in the 5000 m at the 1990 IAAF Grand Prix Final, which resulted in her placing second behind PattiSue Plumer in the series rankings.

She grew up in Târgu Jiu and was part of a successful group of local runners training under coach Ion Bură, which included Constantina Diță, Luminița Gogârlea and Ion Avramescu. She later fell out with Bură and became a running coach herself at CS Pandurii Târgu Jiu, though she spoke highly of him and his training methods. She married Marcel Dima, a former footballer and referee.

International competitions

References

External links

Profile at Track and Field Statistics

1965 births
Living people
Romanian female middle-distance runners
Romanian female long-distance runners
Sportspeople from Târgu Jiu
Romanian female cross country runners
Goodwill Games medalists in athletics
Universiade medalists in athletics (track and field)
Universiade gold medalists for Romania
Universiade silver medalists for Romania
Medalists at the 1989 Summer Universiade
Competitors at the 1990 Goodwill Games